The enzyme N-acetylgalactosamine-6-sulfatase (EC 3.1.6.4) catalyzes the chemical reaction of cleaving off the 6-sulfate groups of the N-acetyl-D-galactosamine 6-sulfate units of the macromolecule chondroitin sulfate and, similarly, of the D-galactose 6-sulfate units of the macromolecule keratan sulfate.

This enzyme belongs to the family of hydrolases, specifically those acting on sulfuric ester bonds.  The systematic name of this enzyme class is ''N-acetyl-D-galactosamine-6-sulfate 6-sulfohydrolase. Other names in common use include chondroitin sulfatase, chondroitinase, galactose-6-sulfate sulfatase, acetylgalactosamine 6-sulfatase, N-acetylgalactosamine-6-sulfate sulfatase, and N''-acetylgalactosamine 6-sulfatase.  This enzyme participates in glycosaminoglycan degradation and degradation of glycan structures.

Deficiency
Morquio syndrome is a rare birth defect caused by a deficiency in this essential enzyme. Treatment options include enzyme replacement therapy with a synthetic version of the enzyme called elosulfase alfa.

References

 

EC 3.1.6
Enzymes of unknown structure